The Hell Ship is a 1920 American silent drama film directed by Scott R. Dunlap and starring Madlaine Traverse, Alan Roscoe, Betty Bouton, Dick La Reno, and Jack Curtis. The film was released by Fox Film Corporation in February 1920.

Cast
Madlaine Traverse as Paula Humphrey
Alan Roscoe as John Hadlock (as Albert Roscoe)
Betty Bouton as Glory - Paula's Sister
Dick La Reno as 'Satan' Humphrey - Their Father
Jack Curtis as Jaeger
Fred Bond as Thorpe (as Fred Bond)
William Ryno as Brabo

Preservation
The film is now considered lost.

See also
List of lost films
1937 Fox vault fire

References

External links

1920 drama films
Silent American drama films
1920 films
American silent feature films
American black-and-white films
Fox Film films
Lost American films
1920 lost films
Lost drama films
1920s American films